Aqion is a hydrochemistry software tool. It bridges the gap between scientific software (such like PhreeqC)
and the calculation/handling of "simple" water-related tasks in daily routine practice. The software aqion is free for private users, education and companies.

Motivation & history
First. Most of the hydrochemical software is designed for experts and scientists. In order to flatten the steep learning curve aqion provides an introduction to fundamental water-related topics in form of a "chemical pocket calculator".

Second. The program mediates between two terminological concepts: The calculations are performed in the "scientific realm" of thermodynamics (activities, speciation, log K values, ionic strength, etc.). Then, the output is translated into the "language" of common use: molar and mass concentrations, alkalinity, buffer capacities, water hardness, conductivity and others.

History. Version 1.0 was released in January 2012 (after a half-year test run in 2011). The project is active with 1-2 updates per month.

Features
 Validates aqueous solutions (charge balance error, parameter adjustment)
 Calculates physico-chemical parameters: alkalinity, buffer capacities (ANC, BNC), water hardness, ionic strength
 Calculates aqueous speciation and complexation
 Calculates pH of solutions after addition of chemicals (acids, bases, salts)
 Calculates the calcite-carbonate system (closed/open  system, Langelier Saturation Index)
 Calculates mineral dissolution, precipitation, and saturation indices
 Calculates mixing of two waters
 Calculates reduction-oxidation (redox) reactions
 Plots titration curves

Fields of application
 Water analysis and water quality
 Geochemical modeling (in simplest form)
 Education

Limits of application
 only inorganic species (no organic chemistry)
 only equilibrium thermodynamics (no chemical kinetics)
 only aqueous solutions with ionic strength ≤ 0.7 mol/L (no brines)

Basic algorithm & numerical solver
There are two fundamental approaches in hydrochemistry: Law of mass action (LMA) and Gibbs energy minimization (GEM).
The program aqion belongs to the category LMA approach. In a nutshell: A system of NB independent basis components j (i.e. primary species), that combines to form NS secondary species i, is represented by a set of mass-action and mass-balance equations:

(1)       mass action law:                 with i = 1 ... NS

(2)       mass balance law:                 with j = 1 ... NB

where Ki is the equilibrium constant of formation of the secondary species i, and νi,j represents the stoichiometric coefficient of basis species j in secondary species i (the values of νj,i can be positive or negative). Here, activities ai are symbolized by curly brackets {i} while concentrations ci by rectangular brackets [i]. Both quantities are related by the

(3)       activity correction:         

with γi as the activity coefficient calculated by the Debye–Hückel equation and/or Davies equation. Inserting Eq.(1) into Eq.(2) yields a nonlinear polynomial function fj for the j-th basis species:

(4)       		 	

which is the objective function of the Newton–Raphson method.

To solve Eq.(4) aqion adopts the numerical solver from the open-source software PhreeqC.
The equilibrium constants Ki are taken from the thermodynamic database wateq4f.

Examples, test & verification
The software aqion is shipped with a set of example solutions (input waters) and a tutorial how to attack typical water-related problems (online-manual with about 40 examples). More examples and exercises for testing and re-run can be found in classical textbooks of hydrochemistry.

The program was verified by benchmark tests of specific industry standards.

Screenshots

References

External links
 PHREEQC
 Online calculator for pH, aqueous speciation, saturation indices, alkalinity, EC

Computational chemistry software
Science education software